The following lists events that happened during 1831 in Australia.

The year of the Ripon Land Grant, which attracted many settlers to Australia.

Incumbents

Governors
Governors of the Australian colonies:
Governor of New South Wales - Ralph Darling (to 23 October).
Governor of New South Wales - Major-General Sir Richard Bourke (from 23 October).
Lieutenant-Governor of Tasmania - Colonel George Arthur
Lieutenant-Governor of Western Australia as a Crown Colony - Captain James Stirling

Events
 4 March - James Stirling commissioned as Lieutenant-Governor of Western Australia, rectifying the absence of a legal instrument providing the authority detailed in Stirling's Instructions of 30 December 1828.
 14 March - The Surprise, the first paddle steamer built in Australia, was launched in Sydney.
 18 April - The Sydney daily newspaper and Australia's oldest newspaper The Sydney Morning Herald is first published.
 The Ripon Land Regulation Act provides land grants.

Arts and literature
Australia's first novel, Quintus Servinton: A Tale founded upon Incidents of Real Occurrence was written and published in Tasmania . It was written by the convicted English forger Henry Savery and published anonymously.

Births
Lewis Bernays
James Boucaut
William John Clarke
William Bede Dalley
John Darling
Alfred Felton
Walter Russell Hall
Laurence Halloran
Robert Herbert
Adelaide Ironside
Martin Howy Irving
Patrick Jennings
George Kerferd
Duncan McIntyre
Thomas Petrie
Frederick Pottinger
Henry Gyles Turner

Deaths
 22 December – Charles Fraser, botanist (b. 1788)
 Collet Barker
 John Hayes

 
Australia
Years of the 19th century in Australia